Naseem Hamed vs. Wilfredo Vázquez was a professional boxing match contested on April 18, 1998 for the WBO and Lineal featherweight championships.

Background
In December of the previous year WBO featherweight champion Naseem Hamed had made his American debut after inking a 6-fight contract with cable giant HBO. Hamed had took on one of his toughest opponents at the time in former WBA featherweight champion Kevin Kelley. In an action packed fight that HBO commentator Larry Merchant dubbed the Hagler–Hearns of the featherweight division, Hamed and Kelley each scored three knockdowns over one another with Hamed ultimately scoring the KO victory in the fourth round. In March 1998, it was announced that Hamed would return to his native England to face veteran 3-division world champion Wilfredo Vázquez of Puerto Rico. Vazquez had captured the WBA version of the featherweight title in 1996 and was recognized as the lineal champion of the division. Though Vazquez was supposed to make a mandatory title defense against WBA's number one contender Antonio Cermeño , Vazquez had hoped that the WBA would allow him to postpone his match with Cermeño and instead allow him to defend the title against Hamed, but the WBA instead opted to strip him of the title.

For Hamed's return to England, promoter Frank Warren organized a fight card that also included Chris Eubank moving up to the cruiserweight division to challenge Carl Thompson for the WBO cruiserweight championship and Herbie Hide defending his WBO heavyweight crown against Damon Reed. Steve Robinson was also originally scheduled to challenge Luisito Espinosa for the WBC featherweight title, but Espinosa pulled out of the bout after his father and trainer Egmedio suffered a heart attack prior to the fight.

The Fight
Prior to the fight, Hamed predicted that he would knock out Vázquez within 2 rounds, though his prediction would not come to be. Through the first two rounds, Hamed was the more active puncher as Vazquez took a more defensive approach and attempted to counter the highly unorthodox Hamed. As the first round came to a close, Hamed threw Vazquez to the canvas after he missed with a left hand and the resulting momentum caused Vazquez to go down. In the second round, Vazquez wobbled the champion after landing a hard right hook, but Hamed was able to quickly regain his composure. Hamed began to take control in round 3 as he was able score his first knockdown of the fight. Rivera landed a straight right to Hamed's head, but Hamed countered with a left hand that sent Vasquez down, though he was able to quickly get back up and continue the fight. After controlling both rounds 4 and 5, Hamed landed a straight left in the sixth that again put Vasquez down for the second time, but Vasquez was again able to continue. Shortly after, the referee momentarily stopped the bout as one of the ring ropes had come loose. After an over 5-minute delay in which the damaged rope had to be completely removed and in which Vasquez and Hamed exchanged words before Vasquez got into Hamed's face and headbutted him, the fight resumed. Early in round 7, Vasquez swung and missed Hamed with a right hook and Hamed countered with a strong left that put Vasquez down for the third time. Vasquez was clearly hurt from the exchange and Hamed dropped Vasquez again with another left. Vasquez again got back up, but was swarmed by a barrage of punches by Hamed causing the referee to stop the fight and award Hamed the TKO victory at 2:29 of the seventh round.

Fight card

References

1998 in boxing
Boxing matches
Boxing in England
Sports competitions in Manchester
1998 in English sport